is a Japanese former windsurfer, who specialized in the RS:X class. She was the country's top female windsurfer for the 2008 Summer Olympics, finishing in thirteenth place. A member of Toyama Sailing Federation, Kosuge trained most of her competitive sporting career for the national team.

Kosuge competed for the Japanese sailing squad, as a 34-year-old, in the inaugural women's RS:X class at the 2008 Summer Olympics in Beijing. She topped the selection criteria in a duel against the quota recipient Yuki Sunaga for the country's RS:X berth, based on her cumulative scores in a series of international regattas approved by the Japan Sailing Federation. Kosuge enjoyed the initial half of the series with a couple of top ten marks recorded, before fading temporarily towards the middle of the fleet. She made a late surge to finish seventh on the final leg but fell short to enter the medal race by the narrowest margin, sitting her in thirteenth overall with 102 net points.

References

External links
 
 
 
 Yasuko Kosuge at the Japanese Olympic Committee
 Yasuko Kosuge at NBC 2008 Olympics website

1974 births
Living people
Japanese female sailors (sport)
Japanese windsurfers
Olympic sailors of Japan
Sailors at the 2008 Summer Olympics – RS:X
Sportspeople from Kanagawa Prefecture
Female windsurfers